is a Japanese otome game series and media franchise. There are various OVAs, Drama CDs, Music CDs and Anime series, developed along with the base game, or broadcast on TV channels, etc. The series began in 1994 and has continued since. The latest entry in the series is Angelique Luminarise, released in 2021.

The first game was released in 1994 on Super Famicom. This is the first otome game (dating sim for women) known in the world. Angelique series is also the first otome game series of the Neo Romance series by Ruby Party. Currently, the games in this series are only published in Japanese.

Plot 
The basic lore of the series is built around a Queen who fairly and wisely rules a Universe. By balancing elemental forces with the help of nine Guardians, she keeps the various planets in her domain stable and her people content. However, the powers of the Queen and the Guardians fade over time, and successors must be appointed. In the first game Angelique, the protagonist is a 17-year-old girl named Angelique Limoges who has been chosen by the current Queen and her aide Dia as one of two candidates from the Royal Smallney Girls' Academy to become the next Queen. She is transported to the Flying City to begin her final examination.

Each of the candidates is given a land to populate. Whoever finishes populating their land first wins and becomes the next Queen. It is done with the help of nine Guardians who use their powers to make the people of the candidate's land happy, or to devastate their rival's lands. Along the way, the candidates become friends with the Guardians and can fall in love. If they choose love, they forfeit their chance to become Queen, but will live happily ever after.

The story expands in later titles, but most entries in the series feature a girl named Angelique or a variant thereof (Enju or Ange) as the protagonist, with ever larger casts of characters. The roster of potential love interests swells to 19 characters in later titles (in Angelique Trois and Angelique Etoile).

Gameplay 
Through the Angelique series games, the story begins with some crisis of the Universe, or some troubles in the Universe. To resolve a crisis or troubles, one girl is selected to become a savior of these crisis or troubles.

The player takes on the role of this girl. In the first game, Angelique, the player becomes a candidate for the new queen who will be the savior of the universal crisis. The player is asked to complete her mission or task during the course of the game. If the player completes her mission in the scheduled period, before her rival candidate completes the mission, the player will win and become the new queen.

But while trying to complete the given mission or task, the player necessarily needs some help from the nine guardians, who know and control the spiritual powers of the universe. The player needs to win their favor. If they do not favor a player, they will not provide assistance to that player. To win favor from the guardians, the player should properly work in her mission. Thus, the guardians may favor her.

And when the player wins favor of the guardians and the male characters, she will be able to better perform her task, and at the same time, she is capable of establishing romantic relations with some of the male characters. At this point, there are two options for her. Working best in her mission with the help of the guardians, she can defeat her rival, and become the new queen. The other option is for her to fall in love with one of her favourite male characters. If her love is fulfilled, her rival will become the new queen instead, but she may win the love.

These are two main types of endings to this game.
 Queen ending
 Love ending

In the other games of this series, there is no rival, and the player should perform her mission alone. While trying to complete her mission or task, the same situations take place. To perform her task, the player needs the help of the guardians and other male characters, and she should win their favor. In this case, there are typically two endings, as in the first game:
 Mission complete ending
 Love fulfilled ending
 Other ending

There are many candidates for romance. Typically, the nine guardians are all possible targets of the player's love. There are at least ten main endings, but there are other endings as well, where the mission and/or the romance may be broken. The number of endings ranges between 10 and 30.

The most interesting and difficult points of this game series are that there are many combinations of how to win favor from the guardians and how to complete the task. Sometimes the former and the latter are contradictory, yet the player needs them both to achieve good endings.

Characters 
The major characters appeared in the otome games: Angelique 1994, 1995 (Special), Angelique Special 2 1995, Angelique Trois 2000, Angelique Etoile 2003, and Angelique Luminarise (Anmina) 2021.

Legend:
 "Etoile+" indicates: Both in game Angelique Etoile and anime Koisuru tenshi Angelique.
 "Etoile anim" indicates: In anime Koisuru tenshi Angelique.
 "Etoile" indicates: In game Angelique Etoile.

 In Angelique Etoile, Original universe is called "the universe of Shinchō (the Divine Bird)" and New universe is called "the universe of Seijū (the Sacred Beast)". Alphonsia is the spirit of New universe. Alphonsia appears in the form of a small animal, thus it is called "seijū". 
 In Angelique Luminarise, the stage of the game is the third universe. "The universe of Reikyō (the Honorable Owl)".

Titles

Main series 

First installment in the series developed by Ruby Party. The game follows Angelique Limoges, an ordinary high school girl, is chosen as a queen candidate. With help from the power of the nine Guardians, she aims to be the next Queen. Angelique is generally considered to have popularized the otome game market. Angelique Voice Fantasy, Angelique Special, and Angelique Duet are all different versions of this game. The game was released on September 23, 1994, for Super Famicom. A Game Boy Advance version was released on March 21, 2003. A full remake titled  was released for PlayStation Portable and PlayStation Vita.

Angelique Special is a revised version of the first game and features several new animated scenes, in addition to voice acting by several big-name voice actors. Among the new animated scenes were several love events that were not present in the original game. Others included the opening sequence and the endings. released on December 22, 1995 for PC-FX and published by NEC Home Electronics. The game was ported to PC, Sega Saturn, and PlayStation on  March 29, 1996.

Angelique Voice Fantasy included a special Audio CD and an add-on called Voicer-kun, which allowed for the addition of voice acting. The game contents are otherwise identical to the original version. It was released on March 29, 1996 for Super Famicom.

Angelique Duet was released on July 30, 1998 for Sega Saturn and PlayStation. The game was ported to the Nintendo DS on February 2006 This version allows the player to choose the usual heroine, Angelique Limoges, or her rival Rosalia de Catargena, as the main character. The DS version introduced a messaging feature.

, a full remake with new artwork as well as two new characters, was released for PlayStation Portable and PlayStation Vita on December 17, 2015.
Second installment in the series. Angelique Collet, a girl who lives in the universe that the heroine of the first game now rules, is chosen as a queen candidate for a new universe. The count of male characters increases to include the nine Guardians, as well as three Tutors and three Collaborators.
Third installment in the series. Angelique Collet, now queen of a new universe, is drawn into a pocket universe, Arcadia, with the rest of the Angelique Special 2 cast. She develops the wilderness of Arcadia in order to free Elda, a strange being she finds there.
Fourth installment in the series. The main character is a girl from the universe ruled by Angelique Limoges named Ange, who must save the new universe (the Seojū universe) as the "Legendary Etoile". Includes all of the major characters from previous Angelique titles, plus three new "Seijū Universe" Guardians.

The first Nintendo Switch installment of the series, scheduled for release on May 20, 2021. The main character is a 25-year-old single office worker. It is the first new entry in the main Angelique series in 18 years.

Spin-offs 

A traditional role-playing video game with dating sim events and multiple endings. Angelique Collet is the heroine. The universe which Angelique Limoges rules is under attack from a mysterious figure called the "emperor", and Angelique Collet must come to the rescue.
Angelique Limoges is the main character. The goal is to explore the Flying City to find the Guardian's tea party. Though a board game, it has dating sim events and multiple endings.
Features the first two heroines, their rivals, the nine Guardians and the tutors and collaborators as students attending the same high school. The goal is to make dessert dishes and get rewards for them. Though a board game, it has dating sim events and multiple endings.
 for PlayStation Portable

Games in non-Japanese language 

As of May 2022, the game series has been released exclusively in Japanese, except for a Chinese PC version of the first game in 1994. Although KOEI is not opposed to releasing the games in other language(s) than Japanese, in order for such translations to be produced, the existence of enough demand must be shown.

Related media

Software 
 The first game series (Angelique 1994, Angelique Special 1995)
 : Released on July 21, 1995. Desktop accessories for Windows and Macintosh.
 : Released in 1996. Multi-letter printing software for Windows 95. 
 : Released on January 31, 1997. Desktop accessories for Windows 95.
 : Released on October 27, 2000. Email software for Windows95/98/Me and MacOS8.1/9.

OVA 
 Angelique (Special, part 1, 2, 3) (Clavis: Hideyuki Tanaka)

Manga 
Angelique Serialized in Monthly Asuka by Kadokawa Shoten in 1996. This manga series was published as ten tankobon books series. Artist is Kairi Yura who is the character designer of the game series Angelique.
Guruguru Angelique (J.O. Oda)
Angelique Retour. two volumes tankobon.
Sengoku Angelique, a 2010 spinoff published in B's LOG Comic Kyun

Anime, OVA series 
There are 4 OVA series:
OVA 1 -  (2000; 2 episodes) - sequel to game events
OVA 2 -  (2001; 3 episodes)
OVA 3 -  (2002; 8 episodes)
OVA 4 -  (2004; 3 episodes) - based on video game; first series chronologically, prequel to Shiroi Tsubasa no Memoire

Angelique Limoges and Rosalia de Catargena have been chosen as candidates in a Queen Examination - a test to see who is better qualified to be the next Queen of the universe. For this special examination, both girls are given their own continent on a planet. The girls must raise the continents into thriving civilizations and environments. Nine Guardians (who control various spiritual elements, such as fire, wind, and water) have been chosen to help the girls raise their continents during the Queen Examination.

Anime, Television series spin-offs 
There was a Koi Suru Tenshi Angelique series (25 episodes) from 2006 to 2007.
 (13 eps) 2006 spinoff of the OVAs
 (12 eps) 2007 sequel to 2006 series

CDs

Vocal and soundtrack CDs 
 Angelique, Yasashī ai no melody
 Angelique, Fallin' love
 Angelique, Soiree
 Angelique, Sing & Talk - Harmonia
 Vocal collection, Angelique Luminarise Sparkle! 10 March 2022

Drama CDs 
 Angelique, Hikari to yami no sacrea (Clavis: Bin Shimada)
 Angelique, Tokimeki no hōseki-bako (Clavis: Bin Shimada)
 Angelique, Koi wa Push & Push!
 Angelique, Anata no hitomi ni yume-tenshi (sweet angel)
 Angelique, Madowase naide sei-shōjo (innocent girl)
 Angelique duet, Hikōtoshi monogatari
 Angelique Luminarise, 1st step, 14 October 2020 
 Angelique Luminarise, 2nd step, 11 November 2020
 Angelique Luminarise, 3rd step, 2 December 2020

Gaiden Drama series 

''' Reception 
Keiko Erikawa established the woman-based game developing team in the mid-1980s. This resulted in the birth of team Ruby Party and the first otome game Angelique in 1994.(ja) Den-faminico-gamer.com (retrieved 14 May 2022)

The Angelique series greatly promoted and produced the development of otome games and their franchise markets.

The Angelique games sold over 850,000 copies in 2020.  Koei-Tecmo has reported sales of the 2021 game Angelique Luminarise in the 30,000s in Japan and Asia in the first quarter of 2021 (April to June). According to Teitengame.com, the sales ranking of Angelique Luminarise is 132nd, and its total sales in 2021 were 14,506.

 Related game series 
 Neo Romance series Neo Romance series is the otome game series developed by the women-based group Ruby Party in KOEI.
 Angelique series (The otome game series in this article).
 Harukanaru Toki no Naka de - Second game series of the Neo Romance.
 Kin'iro no Corda - Third game series of the Neo Romance.
 Neo Angelique - Fourth game series. This is totally different game from the series Angelique. Neither sequel nor spin-off. According to Ruby Party, the world of the series Angelique is the distant past of the Neo Angelique. Therefore, a bit similar gadgets appear, such that the stage of Neo Angelique is the continent Arcadia, which was the stage of Angelique Trois.

 Notes and references 

 Bibliography 
 (ja) Naomi Tanizaki Angelique, Memorial book, 1995–0810, Koei 
 (ja) Naomi Tanizaki Angelique Special, Sweet guide, 1996, Koei 
 (ja) Naomi Tanizaki Angelique Special 2, Sweet guide, 1997, Koei 
 (ja) Naomi Tanizaki, Kio Okita Angelique Special 2, Memorial book, 1997–0930, Koei 
 (ja) Ruby Party ed. Angelique Trois, Sweet guide, 2000, Koei 
 (ja) Ruby Party ed. Angelique Trois, Memorial book, I, 2001–0707, Koei 
 (ja) Ruby Party ed. Angelique Trois, Memorial book, II, 2001–0904, Koei 
 (ja) Ruby Party ed. Angelique Etoile, Official guide, 2003–1230, Koei 
 (ja) Ruby Party ed. Angelique Etoile, Handbook, 2004–0129, Koei 
 (ja) Ruby Party ed. Angelique Etoile, Memorial book, 2005–0319, Koei 
 (ja) Ruby Party ed. Neo Angelique, Memorial book'', 2008, Koei

External links
Official Neoromance website
Angelique at Neo-Romance.net
 
My Neoromance
Angelique Games information and screenshots from C-games.info

 
Fantasy anime and manga
Koei games
Japan-exclusive video games
Manga (year of release missing)
Raising sims
Romance video games
Romance anime and manga
Shōjo manga
Koei Tecmo franchises
Video game franchises
Otome games
OVAs based on video games
1994 video games
Game Boy games
Nintendo DS games
Nintendo Switch games
PC-FX games
PlayStation (console) games
PlayStation Portable games
PlayStation Vita games
Sega Saturn games
Super Nintendo Entertainment System games
Windows games
Video games developed in Japan
Video games featuring female protagonists